Juan Ávalos (born 8 January 1941) is a Spanish former sports shooter. He competed at the 1972, 1976 and the 1984 Summer Olympics.

References

1941 births
Living people
Spanish male sport shooters
Olympic shooters of Spain
Shooters at the 1972 Summer Olympics
Shooters at the 1976 Summer Olympics
Shooters at the 1984 Summer Olympics
Sportspeople from Madrid
20th-century Spanish people